Mauno Vilho Pohjonen (25 January 1907 – 7 October 1987) was a Finnish agronomist, civil servant and politician, born in Kärkölä. He was a Member of the Parliament of Finland from 1960 to 1970 and again from 1971 to 1972, representing the Agrarian League, which renamed itself the Centre Party in 1965.

References

1907 births
1987 deaths
People from Kärkölä
People from Häme Province (Grand Duchy of Finland)
Centre Party (Finland) politicians
Finnish People's Democratic League politicians
Members of the Parliament of Finland (1958–62)
Members of the Parliament of Finland (1962–66)
Members of the Parliament of Finland (1966–70)
Members of the Parliament of Finland (1970–72)
University of Helsinki alumni
Finnish military personnel of World War II